The 2009 Aegon International was a combined men's and women's tennis tournament played on outdoor grass courts. It was the 35th edition of the event for the women and the 1st edition for the men. It was classified as a WTA Premier tournament on the 2009 WTA Tour and as an ATP World Tour 250 series on the 2009 ATP World Tour. The event took place at the Devonshire Park Lawn Tennis Club in Eastbourne, United Kingdom from June 13 through June 20, 2009.

ATP entrants

Seeds

 Seedings are based on the rankings as of June 8, 2009.

Other entrants
The following players received wildcards into the main draw:

  Joshua Goodall
  James Ward
  Colin Fleming

The following qualified for the main draw:

  Tatsuma Ito
  Alex Bogdanović
  Frank Dancevic
  Brydan Klein

WTA entrants

Seeds

 Seedings are based on the rankings as of June 8, 2009.

Other entrants
The following players received wildcards into the main draw:

  Svetlana Kuznetsova
  Anne Keothavong
  Elena Baltacha

The following qualified for the main draw:

  Ekaterina Makarova
  Vera Dushevina
  Jarmila Groth
  Urszula Radwańska

Finals

Men's singles

 Dmitry Tursunov defeated  Frank Dancevic, 6–3, 7–6(5)
It was Tursunov's first title of the year and 6th of his career.

Women's singles

 Caroline Wozniacki  defeated  Virginie Razzano, 7–6(5), 7–5
It was Wozniacki's second title of the year and 5th of her career.

Men's doubles

 Mariusz Fyrstenberg /  Marcin Matkowski defeated  Travis Parrott /  Filip Polášek, 6–4, 6–4

Women's doubles

 Akgul Amanmuradova /  Ai Sugiyama defeated  Samantha Stosur /  Rennae Stubbs, 6–4, 6–3

References

External links
Official site

Aegon International
Aegon International
Eastbourne International
Aegon International, 2009
June 2009 sports events in the United Kingdom